Manigri  is a small town and arrondissement in the commune of Bassila in the Donga Department of west central Benin. It is a south-eastern suburb of Bassila town.

Manigri has several surrounding towns and villages such as; Igbere, Kikele, Manigri Ikanni, Manigri Oke, Igbomakoro, Wannou and Aworo.
According to the population census of 2013 by the National Institute of Statistics and Economic Analysis (INSAE), Manigri has 26,409 inhabitants.

External links
Satellite map at Maplandia

Arrondissements of Benin
Populated places in the Donga Department
Commune of Bassila